Woodswallows are soft-plumaged, somber-coloured passerine birds in the genus Artamus. The woodswallows are either treated as a subfamily, Artaminae, in an expanded family Artamidae (also including the subfamily Cracticinae), or as the only genus in that family (with the butcherbirds, currawongs, and allies placed in a separate family, Cracticidae). The generic name, which in turn gives rise to the family name, is derived from the Ancient Greek artamos, meaning butcher or murder. The name was given due to their perceived similarity to shrikes. A former common name for the group was "swallow-starlings".

The woodswallows have an Australasian distribution, with most species occurring in Australia and New Guinea. The ashy woodswallow has an exclusively Asian distribution, ranging from India and Sri Lanka through South East Asia to China, and the most widespread species is the white-breasted woodswallow, which ranges from Peninsular Malaysia through to Australia in the south and Vanuatu and New Caledonia. The group reaches the easternmost extent of its distribution in Fiji with the endemic Fiji woodswallow.

Woodswallows are smooth, agile flyers with moderately large, semi-triangular wings. They are among the very few passerines birds that soar, and can often be seen feeding just above the treetops. One sedentary species aside, they are nomads, following the best conditions for flying insects, and often roosting in large flocks.

Although woodswallows have a brush-tipped tongue they seldom use it for gathering nectar.

The nests of woodswallows are loosely constructed from fine twigs, and both parents help rear the young.

Species of Artamus

References

External links
Woodswallow videos on the Internet Bird Collection

Artamidae